Chuck Hoskin is a Cherokee-American politician and former member of the Oklahoma House of Representatives from the 6th district, which includes parts of Craig, Mayes, and Rogers counties. He served as a whip for the Democratic caucus. He is a citizen of the Cherokee Nation, and he served from 1995 to 2007 as a member of the Tribal Council, and in 2011 became Chief of Staff for the Principal Chief, Baker. In 2019 his son, Chuck Hoskin Jr., was elected Principal Chief of Cherokee Nation.

Early life
Hoskin was born on January 29, 1952, in Claremore, Oklahoma.

After graduating from Vinita High School in 1970, he enlisted in the U.S. Navy. He was stationed aboard  until his honorable discharge. After the Navy, he received his AA degree from Northeastern Oklahoma A&M College and his BA and M.Ed from Northeastern State University. Before being elected to office, he served as an administrator for Locust Grove Public Schools in Locust Grove, Oklahoma. He is married to Stephanie and has three children: Amy, Charles Jr., and Amelia. Along with being an elected official, Hoskin also served as Chief of Staff to the Principal Chief of the Cherokee Nation, Bill John Baker.

Political career
Hoskin was elected to the House in 2006, defeating Republican Wayland Smalley in the 2006 election, after the incumbent, Joe Eddins, retired.

Hoskin served on the Appropriations & Budget, Public Safety, Veterans & Military Affairs committees, as well as the Redistricting Eastern Oklahoma Subcommittee and the Joint Committee on Appropriations & Budget.

Election results

Cherokee Nation service
A citizen of the Cherokee Nation, Hoskin served for 12 years on the Tribal Council, from 1995 to 2007. Hoskin also served as Chief of Staff to Principal Chief Bill John Baker.

References

1952 births
21st-century American politicians
21st-century Native American politicians
Cherokee Nation politicians
Living people
Democratic Party members of the Oklahoma House of Representatives
Cherokee Nation state legislators in Oklahoma
Cherokee Nation United States military personnel
Northeastern Oklahoma A&M College alumni
Northeastern State University alumni
People from Claremore, Oklahoma
People from Locust Grove, Oklahoma
People from Vinita, Oklahoma
20th-century Native Americans